Senthildass Velayutham (earlier called Senthildass), an Indian playback singer, predominantly works in Tamil film industry. He has also been singing playback in Telugu, Malayalam, and Hindi movies. In the beginning, Senthildass used to record his own songs and published them on social media. Senthildass has performed more than 5000 live concerts in India and abroad. He was one of the key persons in the protest against the use of agriculture lands for hydrocarbon extraction project in the delta region of Tamil Nadu.

Early life
Senthildass Velayutham was born in Neduvasal village in Pudukkottai district, Tamil Nadu. He was a self-taught musician during his school days in Neduvasal village. While studying in college in Pudukkottai, he used to sing in light music band. He later moved to Chennai for searching job, and got a chance to sing in light music orchestra. During the musical program, the other musicians encouraged him to learn music properly for a better performance. He then joined Tamil Music College, Chennai. He completed a three-year diploma in music, and also got a master's degree in music from the same college.  By seeing his academic performance, Tamil Music College offered him the position of a lecturer. After working for a year, he realized that his dream to sing in movies is going away.

Singing career
With an ambition to become a playback singer, Senthildass Velayutham recorded his vocals and played to different music directors.  It was music composer Srikanth Deva who gave him the first chance to sing the song “Usilampatti Sandhaiyila” in a 2008 Tamil movie Thenavattu, which was a popular folk song.  Since then he has sung the songs composed by all leading music directors in the film industry including Ilaiyaraaja, Deva, Harris Jayaraj, D. Imman,  Yuvan Shankar Raja, Sundar C Babu,  Karthik Raja, Dhina, Mani Sharma, Santhosh Narayanan, Sam C. S., Vijay Antony, Isaac Thomas Kottukapally and Sabesh–Murali. His song “Andipatti Kanava Kathu” in the 2016 Tamil hit movie Dharmadurai, sung with Surmukhi Raman, made him a popular singer.

Writing lyrics
Senthildass Velayutham wrote the song "Enna Vittu Pona" for the film Raame Aandalum Raavane Aandalum with Krish composing the music.

Discography
According to popular online media musical sources, the discography of Senthildass Velayutham includes

Participation in Neduvasal protest
Senthildass Velayutham was the public face of a people's movement at Neduvasal, a village in the delta region with rich groundwater and fertile soil, against the proposed hydrocarbon extraction process in delta region in Tamil Nadu. In 2017, Neduvasal,  located about 60 km from Thanjavur, became the centre of global attention, after farmers and residents of more than 60 villages staged widespread protests against a proposed  multi-crore hydrocarbon extracting project citing environmental concerns, and the effects it could have on their agricultural lands. 
Conceived in 2009, this hydrocarbon project covers 667 square km area in Thanjavur, Nagapattinam, Pudukkottai, Thiruvarur, Tiruchirappalli, Ariyalur, Perambalur and Karaikal districts. Senthildass was one the committee members who made several representations to the state and central governments to withdraw the hydrocarbon extraction project. The protest was called off after three weeks, following an assurance from the governments to suspend the project.

References

External links
 Raaga.com, Senthildass songs
Hungama.com, Senthildass songs

Living people
Tamil playback singers
Tamil musicians
21st-century Indian singers
Tamil singers
Indian male playback singers
1970 births